Thomas McGivern, D.D. (b. Ballynanny, County Down 20 December 1829; d. Newry 24 November 1900) was an Irish Catholic Priest who served as Bishop of Dromore from 1890 to 1900.

McGivern was educated at St Colman's College, Newry and The Irish College, Rome. He was ordained priest in 1854. After curacies at Ballynahinch and Newry he was parish priest at Drumgath from 1872 to 1887. He was ordained Coadjutor Bishop of Dromore in 1886 and its Diocesan in 1890, a post he held until his death.

References

1829 births
1900 deaths
19th-century Roman Catholic bishops in Ireland
Roman Catholic bishops of Dromore
People from County Down
Alumni of The Irish College, Rome
People educated at St Colman's College, Newry